222 Second Street is a  office skyscraper in the South of Market District of San Francisco, California. It is under lease by social networking company LinkedIn (headquartered in nearby Sunnyvale).

Construction began in August 2013, still without a tenant on hand.

In April 2014, LinkedIn announced it was leasing the building for an undisclosed sum, to accommodate up to 2,500 of its employees, with the lease covering 10 years. The goal was to join all of its San Francisco based staff (1,250 as of January 2016) in one building, bring sales and marketing employees together with the research and development team.

The building was topped-out in August 2014 and opened in March 2016, with LinkedIn staff moving in in stages until 2017.

The ground floor is open to the public during work hours, as a privately owned public space. It features three large artworks by Frank Stella, in accordance with the developers' public art proposal to the city Planning Commission, with the purchase price of $1 million matching 1% of the total "construction hard costs".

The San Francisco Chronicle's architecture critic John King characterized the building as "severe yet sleek" and expressed appreciation for the arrangement of the "panes of overlapping glass 6 feet wide and 13 feet high [that] cover a form that begins as a squat 16-story rectangle and concludes as a 10-story square. On the lower four stories the shingled pattern fans to the right; the fifth floor panels are flat, side by side, and then the shingles resume in reverse, flipping tightly to the left. The upper floors reverse the pattern yet again." However, while acknowledging their appeal in certain light situations ("a large-scale shuffle of vivid reflections"), King criticized their dark color (evoking a "dull gloom" on cloudy days). And he chastised the building - "designed and built by New Yorkers" - as being aesthetically out of place on Second Street, "an alien presence in a well-established setting where other recent buildings have done their best to add to the ambiance".

See also

 San Francisco's tallest buildings

References

External links 

The First-rate Charms Of Second Street (video commentary by John King)

Skyscraper office buildings in San Francisco
South of Market, San Francisco
LinkedIn
Leadership in Energy and Environmental Design certified buildings